Naamans Gardens is an unincorporated community in New Castle County, Delaware, United States. Naamans Gardens is located south of Delaware Route 92 between Grubb Road and Delaware Route 261, northeast of Wilmington.

References

External links

Unincorporated communities in New Castle County, Delaware
Unincorporated communities in Delaware
Delaware placenames of Native American origin